Jungle Beat: The Movie is a 2020 computer-animated film directed by Brent Dawes, based on the characters of the television series Jungle Beat. It tells the story of a homesick alien who crash-lands his spaceship near the colorful African Jungle. His new animal friends need to get him back to his ship and teach him about friendship and fun before his Space-Conqueror father can take over the planet.

The film premiered at the 2020 Annecy International Animation Film Festival and was released by Netflix on May 14, 2021.

Plot
In a jungle isolated in the African plains, live a group of animals including Munki the bold, adventurous ape, Trunk, the big-hearted elephant, Rocky, the dog-like rhino, Tallbert, the earnest and awkward giraffe, Humph, the grumpy hedgehog who is very protective over his property, Ribbert, the lazy frog, a female ostrich and her three unhatched chicks that always try to escape, and Ray the firefly. One morning, Munki and Trunk wake up to discover that they can speak, which they take advantage of. They learn that the source of them talking is an jello-like, four-legged alien named Fneep, who has come from the planet Scaldron to conquer Earth and has brought some amazing technology with him, including a translation device called a speech pod that lets the animals talk for the first time that Munki tries on the others. The animals make him give in easily and allow themselves to surrender peacefully, making Fneep's conquest a success. They learn from Fneep that his ship crashed near the mountains, and since he's conquered Earth, he can use the homing beacon in his ship that summons the Scaldronians instantly. Munki, Trunk, Rocky, and Humph agree to come with him on the way to Fneep's ship.

While crossing the plains, they meet a group of singing wildebeest, whose leader misbelieves that Fneep may become the new leader due to the fact that he's conquered Earth and tries to keep his position, but Fneep manages to outdo him, and tells him that the herd are great at what they do and that only reason they follow him is that they love what he does. Resolved, the leader allows them to pass. One of the ostrich eggs tries to follow them and is almost run over by a wildebeest stampede, hatching in the process. Once out of the egg, she believes that since she is a bird, she can also fly, and tries to, but to no avail. After witnessing the mother ostrich hugging the baby ostrich, he learns that hugs are for making someone feel better, knowing he/she isn't alone, saying "I love you", and to feel special. They learn from Fneep that the only way for Scaldronians to feel special is to conquer planets, which prove that they're strong and worthy of respect, and that he's a terrible conqueror due to not conquering any planets until now. Munki, Trunk, and Rocky tell that it doesn't matter if he hasn't conquered any planets and try to give him hugs, but he refuses.

Meanwhile, Humph, who had gone farther than the others, finds Fneep's ship and accidentally jumpstarts the ship by making a hole in the hull after ramming it several times and touches the exposed wire with his tongue after being lured by the spark's bright light, which electrocutes him and elongates his spikes. He learns from a hologram from Fneep's father, Captain Grogon, that Fneep's next step in conquering Earth is to capture all the Earth creatures and imprison them in the Scaldronian museum, the Great Hall Of Conquest, and sets off to rejoin and warn the others. Later that night, Fneep goes to the ship all by himself and after getting back into his ship, a long 60-step reading of the Planet Conquering Manual of how to activate the homing beacon, which is fact, just a simple red button for just 60 steps, pushes the beacon, and Grogon's ship arrives instantly above him.

Despite Humph's pleas and the fact that they're out of the translator's range meaning they can't understand him, the gang eventually reach Fneep's impact site, where he's greeted by Grogon and learn that Fneep lied about conquering Earth. Grogon takes advantage of this to get his 1000th victory, but he stops him by lying that the animals are invincible and unstoppable, making the gang safe for now. Fneep is forced to leave Earth and conquer another one instead, but Munki, Trunk, Rocky, and Humph, refusing to believe what Fneep said, sneak aboard on one of the transporters and tell that Fneep still actually conquered the planet, but they learn from Grogon that the only way to show that the planet is conquered is by using a constellation-creating device into the sky and tries to use his own, but Munki stops him and tries to buy time while Trunk, who fell to the ground with Fneep's star after blasting a hole in the ship with Grogon's gun, which is later blocked by a piece, assigns the baby ostrich to get Fneep's star on board the ship by manually using her trunk to make her fly.

However, after a long battle, Grogon overpowers them all, prevents Fneep from using his star by restraining him and shoots his star into the sky, but Fneep proclaims even though his star's in the sky, he hasn't conquered the animals yet due to their "secret weapon", which is, in fact, hugs, which he uses to confront his dad, and makes him and himself to turn orange, filling him with happiness and joy. After this, they try to do this to the other Scaldronians, which results in the ship about to crash, but the baby ostrich takes control and saves everyone. Eventually, all the other Scaldronians are all effected by the hugs, and Grogon declaims the earth and allows Fneep to claim it. Grogon and Fneep plan to return home to use the hugs on every Scaldronian and repay the group by giving them the speech pods, some of the Scaldronian tech, and a load of giant bananas for Munki to satisfy his hunger.

In the post-credits scenes, Grogon discovers that Ribbert has eaten his gun after eating Fneep's, Tallbert is seen talking in Shona language with the translation device Trunk and the mama ostrich use on him, and Munki, in a protective suit made of vines, finally manages to give Humph a hug.

Cast
 David Menkin as Munki, a shy, playful, clever, naive, sassy and good-hearted monkey, and main protagonist, and as Rocky, a playful Southern white rhinoceros.
 Ina Marie Smith as Trunk, a female African bush elephant.
 Ed Kear as Fneep, an extraterrestrial creature from the species of "Scaldronian", who landed up in the jungle after he accidentally crashed his spacecraft.
 Gavin Peter as Tallbert, a reticulated giraffe.
 Adam Neill as Ribbert, a tree frog, who likes to eat objects, including Scaldronian weapons.
 John Guerrasio as Humph (speaking and vocal effects), a hedgehog.
 David Rintoul as Grogon, the evil captain of the Scaldronian empire, Fneep's father, and main antagonist.
 Emma Lungiswa De Vet as Ray, a firefly.
 Mattew Gair, Jason Pennycooke, Lynton Levengood and Claire Johnston as Wildebeests.
 Florrie Wilkinson as Baby Ostrich, the first hatchling who dreams of flying.
 Lucy Montgomery as Mama Ostrich (speaking and vocal effects), a pink ostrich with blue eyes.
 Brent Dawes as hugging Scaldronian.
 Ryno Ritter as Scaldronian crowd member.

Production

The director Brant Dawes founded Sandcastle Studios in September 2017, during his trip to Forbach, a village located near the Circle Square Retail Park of the Indian Ocean island of Mauritius. As their first feature film, the studio partnered with Sunrise Studios. Production started in April 2018 and finished in March 2020, creating the first Mauritian-South African animated film.

"I wrote and made this movie so that anyone who watches it will enjoy it. It was important to me that as a father of four, I always try to find a movie that we can all watch. I’ve got a range of ages too, 5 to 15 years old, so finding a movie we can all watch, where a 5-year-old isn't too scared and the 15-year-old isn't bored, is tricky. This movie is definitely for a broad audience.", according to director Brant Dawes.

The movie was animated using Autodesk Maya and rendered on Houdini's render farm GPU Mantra to create realistic hair on the animals and the aliens' "Glitter"-like slimy skin. Each animator used render farm machines with 96GB RAM-equipped Dell computers connected by Houdini grooming tools. For example, all the scenes set in the Scaldronian mothership provide thousands of moving complex effect sources, each reflecting back and forth off the background, the ship's lights and the characters' shadows. Each scene of the film took around 4 hours to be rendered and composed.

While most of the modelling, texture, animation and lighting was created in Mauritius, half of the entire production of the movie was produced in South Africa, with voices recorded in London, England, at Soho Square Studios and sound design, foley and final mix done in South Africa at Sunrise Productions in-house studios. Additional animation was provided by Infinite Studios.

References

External links
 
 

2020 films
Animal adventure films
2020 computer-animated films
2020s children's animated films
South African animated films
2020s English-language films
Animated films about friendship
Mauritian films